The A-League was a professional men's soccer league which featured teams from the United States and Canada. Founded in 1996 as the USISL Select League, the competition merged with the American Professional Soccer League in 1997 to become the USISL A-League. In 2005, it was re-branded to the USL First Division.

While it existed, it was a Division II league in the United States soccer league system, below the Division I Major League Soccer which began play the same year. The A-League was the highest tier of three leagues operated by United Soccer Leagues (formerly USISL).

History

Background
The origins of the A-League go back to 1986 and 1987 with the creation of three unrelated semi-professional soccer leagues.  On the north-west coast, the Western Soccer Alliance (WSA), a summer outdoor league, emerged in response to the collapse of the North American Soccer League.  In the southwest United States, the Southwest Indoor Soccer League was created in response to the upsurge in popularity of the Major Indoor Soccer League.  Finally, in 1987, the Canadian Soccer League emerged with eight teams across Canada.

While the SISL remained virtually unknown to the wider soccer community, the Western Soccer Alliance grew in popularity and inspired the creation of the third American Soccer League in 1988.  By the summer of 1989, these two leagues began considering a merger.  At the same time, the SISL had grown to seventeen indoor teams and had added a summer outdoor schedule, known as the Southwest Outdoor Soccer League with included eight teams.  In 1990, the WSA and ASL merged to form the American Professional Soccer League with twenty-two teams across the United States.  At the same time, the SISL expanded to fourteen outdoor teams.

In 1992, the SISL renamed itself the United States Interregional Soccer League (USISL) and had grown to twenty-one teams.  By the 1993 season, the number of teams in the USISL had doubled to forty-two.

The mergers between all of these leagues continued in 1993 with the collapse of the Canadian Soccer League. This led to three Canadian teams, the Vancouver 86ers, Toronto Blizzard and Montreal Impact joining the American Professional Soccer League for the 1993 season. So by the summer of 1993, only two outdoor leagues competed for national attention in North America, the United States Interregional Soccer League and the American Professional Soccer League. However, by this time, the USISL was growing and the APSL was shrinking.

In 1995, the American Professional Soccer League was down to six teams – two Canadian and four American.  It also changed its name to the A-League. At the same time, the rapidly growing USISL had split its teams into two leagues, the fully professional Professional League and the semi-professional Premier League.

Foundation
In 1996, the USISL launched the Select League as its highest tier of three leagues. It debuted with 21 of its most successful clubs. With the creation of the Select League, the USISL now competed directly with the A-League for Division II recognition. This led the two leagues, the A-League which was made up the remains of the old Western Soccer Alliance, American Soccer League and Canadian Soccer League, and the USISL to enter merger talks. The creation of Major League Soccer in 1996 as an American Division I league also spurred the merger.

In 1997, six of the seven remaining A-League teams – Montreal Impact, Colorado Foxes,  Seattle Sounders, Rochester Raging Rhinos, Vancouver 86ers and Atlanta Ruckus, plus two planned A-League expansion teams (Toronto Lynx and Hershey Wildcats) merged with the USISL Select League to form the USISL A-League, a consolidated North American Division II league with twenty-four teams.

In 1999, the USISL renamed itself the United Soccer Leagues (USL). The USISL A-League then became the USL A-League. In 2005, the USL A-League was formally renamed the USL First Division or USL-1.

It remained the top league of the Canadian soccer pyramid throughout its existence, with Canadian teams vying for the fan created Voyageurs Cup, until 2007 when Toronto FC debuted in MLS, effectively splitting Division 1 status in Canada between the two leagues. Eventually as the standard of play rose in MLS, by 2010 the USL-1 was effectively Division 2 in Canada.

A-League teams

 Atlanta Silverbacks (1995–2004, as Atlanta Ruckus 1995–98)
 Boston Bulldogs (1997–2000, as Worcester Wildfire 1997–98)
 Calgary Mustangs (2002–04, as Calgary Storm 2002–03)
 California Jaguars (1995–98)
 Carolina Dynamo (1997)
 Charleston Battery (1997–2004)
 Charlotte Eagles (2001–03)
 Cincinnati Riverhawks (1998–2003)
 Connecticut Wolves (1995–2001)
 Edmonton Aviators (2004)
 El Paso Patriots (1997–2003)
 Hershey Wildcats (1997–2001)
 Indiana Blast (1999–2003)
 Jacksonville Cyclones (1997–99)
 Lehigh Valley Steam (1999)
 Long Island Rough Riders (1997–2001)
 Maryland Mania (1999)
 Milwaukee Rampage (1997–2002)
 Milwaukee Wave United (2003–04)
 Minnesota Thunder (1997–2004)
 MLS Project 40 (1998–2000)
 Montreal Impact (1995–2004)

 Nashville Metros (1997–2001, as Tennessee Rhythm 1999–2000)
 New Orleans Storm (1997–99, as New Orleans Riverboat Gamblers 1997)
 New York Centaurs (1995)
 New York Fever (1996)
 Orange County Waves (1997–2000, as Orange County Zodiac 1997–99)
 Orlando Sundogs (1997)
 Pittsburgh Riverhounds (1999–2003)
 Portland Timbers (2001–04)
 Puerto Rico Islanders (2004)
 Raleigh Capital Express (1997–2000, as Raleigh Flyers 1997–98, Raleigh Express 1999)
 Richmond Kickers (1997–2004)
 Rochester Raging Rhinos (1997–2004)
 Sacramento Geckos (1998–99, as Albuquerque Geckos 1998)
 San Diego Flash (1995–2001, as Colorado Foxes 1995–1997)
 San Francisco Bay Seals (1998–2000, as Bay Area Seals 2000)
 Seattle Sounders (1995–2004)
 Staten Island Vipers (1998–99)
 Syracuse Salty Dogs (2003–04)
 Toronto Lynx (1997–2004)
 Vancouver Whitecaps (1995–2004, as Vancouver 86ers 1995–2000)
 Virginia Beach Mariners (1997–2004, as Hampton Roads Mariners 1997–2000, 2002)

Champions

Playoff season

Regular season

Most successful clubs

References

 
Defunct soccer leagues in the United States
Defunct soccer leagues in Canada
Defunct United Soccer League competitions
1996 establishments in the United States
2004 disestablishments in the United States
Sports leagues established in 1996
Sports leagues disestablished in 2004